George Milles may refer to:
 George Milles, 4th Baron Sondes (1794–1874)
 George Milles, 1st Earl Sondes (1824–1894), British politician